The following is a list of indoor arenas in Argentina with a capacity of at least 3,000 spectators. 
Most of the arenas in this list have multiple uses such as individual sports, team sports as well as cultural events and political events.

Current Arenas

Under construction

Under proposition

References

See also 
List of football stadiums in Argentina
List of indoor arenas by capacity

 
Argentina
Indoor arenas
Indoor arenas